Daniel Munyer (born March 4, 1992) is an American football center for the Tennessee Titans of the National Football League (NFL). He played college football for the University of Colorado and was signed by the Kansas City Chiefs as an undrafted free agent in 2015.

Professional career

Kansas City Chiefs
After going unselected in the 2015 NFL draft, Munyer signed with Kansas City Chiefs on May 19, 2015. He was waived before the start of the season for final roster cuts, but signed with the team's practice squad. On January 5, 2016, the Chiefs promoted Munyer to the active roster.

On September 3, 2016, Munyer was released by the Chiefs, and was signed to the practice squad the next day, only to be released two days later. He was re-signed to the practice squad on September 20 but was released on October 3.

Arizona Cardinals
On December 28, 2016, Munyer was signed to the Cardinals' practice squad. He signed a reserve/future contract with the Cardinals on January 3, 2017.

In 2017, Munyer made the Cardinals final roster, playing in one game before being placed on injured reserve on November 6, 2017.

On March 22, 2018, Munyer re-signed with the Cardinals.

Indianapolis Colts
On July 24, 2019, Munyer was signed by the Indianapolis Colts. He was released on August 31, 2019.

Tennessee Titans
On October 8, 2019, Munyer was signed to the Tennessee Titans practice squad. He was released on November 5, but re-signed a week later. He signed a reserve/future contract with the Titans on January 20, 2020.

Munyer made the Titans initial 53-man roster to start the 2020 season. He was then waived on November 7, 2020, and re-signed to the practice squad three days later. He was elevated to the active roster on December 19 for the team's week 15 game against the Detroit Lions, and reverted to the practice squad after the game.  He was elevated again on January 9, 2021, for the team's wild card playoff game against the Baltimore Ravens, and reverted to the practice squad again following the game. He signed a reserve/future contract with the Titans on January 11, 2021. 

On September 2, 2021, Munyer was placed on injured reserve. He was activated on November 1, then waived three days later and re-signed to the practice squad. After the Titans were eliminated in the Divisional Round of the 2021 playoffs, he signed a reserve/future contract on January 24, 2022. He was placed on injured reserve on August 3, 2022. He was released on August 12, 2022. He was re-signed to the practice squad on December 20, 2022. He was promoted to the active roster two days later.

References

External links 
Colorado Buffaloes bio
Kansas City Chiefs bio 

1992 births
Living people
Players of American football from Los Angeles
American football centers
Colorado Buffaloes football players
Kansas City Chiefs players
Arizona Cardinals players
Indianapolis Colts players
Tennessee Titans players